Cai Qi (born December 5, 1955) is a Chinese politician, who is the current first secretary of the Secretariat of the Chinese Communist Party and the fifth-ranking member of the CCP Politburo Standing Committee. He is additionally the director of the CCP general office.

Cai began his career in Fujian province. He has served successively as the mayor of Sanming, the mayor of Quzhou, the mayor of Hangzhou and the Communist Party secretary of Taizhou, Zhejiang. Beginning in 2010 he served as the executive vice governor of Zhejiang Province, and in 2014 was transferred to Beijing to serve as deputy director of the CCP National Security Commission Office (rank equivalent of minister). Between 2017 and 2022, he was the Communist Party Secretary of Beijing. Largely due to Cai's extensive experience working in Zhejiang province, he is believed to be a political ally of CCP General Secretary Xi Jinping.

Early life 
Cai was born in Youxi County, Fujian province on December 5, 1955. During the latter years of the Cultural Revolution he worked at a rural commune. He joined the Chinese Communist Party in 1975. Cai attended Fujian Normal University and graduated in 1978 with a degree in political economics.

Local careers

Fujian
In the 1980s, Cai served in the General Office of the provincial party organization in Fujian province, gaining a series of rapid promotions. He worked as deputy chief of staff serving provincial leaders, including as secretary to the provincial party secretary. Between 1994 and 1997, he pursued a master's degree in law at his alma mater.

In September 1996 Cai took on his first major role in local government as the deputy Party secretary and later mayor of the city of Sanming in Fujian province.

Zhejiang
He was transferred to Zhejiang in May 1999 serving as the deputy Party Secretary and Mayor of Quzhou. Between March 2002 and April 2004 Cai served as Quzhou's party secretary, the top political office of the city. In April 2004 Cai became party secretary of Taizhou, Zhejiang; at the time, Xi Jinping was the party secretary of Zhejiang province. In April 2007, Cai was promoted to the position Mayor of Hangzhou, the provincial capital, also serving as deputy Party Secretary. In January 2010, he became a member of the provincial Party Standing Committee as head of the party's provincial Organization Department.

In November 2013, Cai became the Executive Vice Governor of Zhejiang province. He made the announcement of his change in jobs on his microblog account.

Cai has a doctoral degree in political economics which he obtained from September 1999 to July 2007 at Fujian Normal University.

Beijing

In March 2014, Cai was said to have been transferred to Beijing to work as the deputy General Office chief of the National Security Commission, a body led by party General Secretary Xi Jinping, though no official announcement was made about this appointment. Given his Zhejiang work experience and his current position and seniority, Cai has been named as a member of the so-called "New Zhijiang Army", i.e., officials who at one point worked under Xi Jinping during his term as Zhejiang party secretary.

After his transfer to Beijing, Cai stopped updating his various social media accounts. The only indication of his whereabouts appeared in news footage at numerous "study sessions" of the Politburo of the Chinese Communist Party, where he was shown seated next to other minister-level officials, suggesting that he was an official of full provincial-ministerial rank and working for the central party organization. It was later confirmed that he was serving as deputy director of the Office of the National Security Commission.

On 31 October 2016, Cai was appointed acting mayor of Beijing, replacing Wang Anshun.

In May 2017, Cai Qi was appointed party secretary of Beijing. Cai's appointment broke nearly all conventions in post-Cultural Revolution political tradition: he was neither a member nor alternate member of the Central Committee, and took on an office that would, under normal circumstances, be accorded Politburo membership. The move assured him a Politburo seat at the 19th Party Congress.

In June 2017, Cai was appointed President of the Beijing Organising Committee for the 2022 Olympic and Paralympic Winter Games.

In June 2020, Cai was appointed to lead the team charged with the elimination of coronavirus in the Xinfadi market.

He was awarded the Gold Olympic Order after the 2022 Winter Olympics.

Top leadership 
At the 20th National Congress of the Chinese Communist Party in October 2022, Cai was elected to the CCP Secretariat and the CCP Politburo Standing Committee, the top decision-making body.

Public image
Cai is known for his extensive use of social media and his unorthodox approach to governance. Cai has referred to Xi as "Xi Dada" (Father Xi) and "Boss Xi!" in public media. The Economist opined in 2017 as Cai "rocketed up the Communist Party’s ranks" that "Xi Jinping has chosen an unusual man to lead the capital city." Cai is said to have been a fan of Kevin Spacey's House of Cards TV serial, and was cited as a fan of the iPhone product.

Cai maintains a Weibo microblog account under the subtitle "Cai Qi, a Bolshevik", which has been active since May 2010. The account was initially opened under the name Qianshui (潜水; literally, "scuba diving"), but he was eventually 'outed' by internet users. The account is 'followed' by over ten million people. He used it regularly to communicate with ordinary internet users. As a sub-provincial-level official Cai was one of the highest-ranking officials to maintain a regular social media presence. It is the opinion of certain political scholars that Cai used this Weibo tool to circumvent existing CCP apparatus and thereby gain public profile, "considerable influence" within the CCP and thereby promotion. Cai has stated of the CCP that:

On the evening of September 14, 2013, a mother of an ordinary government staffer working for the national revenue agency posted on her microblog feed that her son was expected to partake in heavy drinking with superiors on a regular basis as part of his work and that it was affecting his health. The mother pleaded for attention to the case by then Zhejiang party organization chief Cai Qi. A day later Cai responded to her asking which department her son worked at and vowed publicly "your son doesn't have to drink from now on."

References 

1955 births
Living people
People from Sanming
Mayors of Hangzhou
Mayors of Beijing
Political office-holders in Fujian
Members of the 19th Politburo of the Chinese Communist Party
Members of the 20th Politburo Standing Committee of the Chinese Communist Party
Fujian Normal University alumni
Presidents of the Organising Committees for the Olympic Games
Recipients of the Olympic Order
Delegates to the 14th National People's Congress
Delegates to the 13th National People's Congress
Delegates to the 11th National People's Congress
Delegates to the 9th National People's Congress
Directors of the General Office of the Chinese Communist Party